"Another Star" is a song written and performed by Stevie Wonder from his 1976 album Songs in the Key of Life. It is the final track on side four of the double LP.  The flute player Bobbi Humphrey appears in the last section of the song.

Released as a single in 1977, it reached number 32 on the Billboard Hot 100, number 29 Easy Listening, number 18 on the Black Singles chart, and number 2 on the Dance/Disco chart, also reaching number 51 in Canada and number 29 in the UK.

Background
Cash Box said that "a foot-tapping, Latin-influenced rhythm and an unforgettable 'La la la' chorus are but two of the hooks that will take this record to the upper reaches of the pop and R&B charts."  Record World said that "Wonder's venture into salsa also gives him a chance to stretch out vocally more than on past singles."

In Rolling Stone'''s original review of the album, Vince Aletti wrote that the song "bursts with an aching, tender passion that’s turned loose in the dense, danceable Brazilian-flavored production." Writing in Stylus Magazine'', Mallory O'Donnell described it as "a joyous song about heartbreak."

Personnel
Taken from album liner notes
 George Benson – guitar, background vocals
Nathan Watts – bass
 Nathan Alford, Jr. – percussion
 Carmello Hungria Garcia – timbales
 Trevor Lawrence – tenor saxophone
 Hank Redd – alto saxophone
 Raymond Maldonado – trumpet
 Steve Madaio – trumpet
 Bobbi Humphrey – flute
 Josie James – background vocals

Chart performance

Cover versions
The song was covered by Kathy Sledge, who released the song as a single. Sledge's version peaked at number fifty-four on the UK Singles chart in 1995.

Popular culture
The song featured as the theme tune to the BBC's TV coverage of the 2014 FIFA World Cup in Brazil.

References

External links
 

1977 singles
Stevie Wonder songs
Songs written by Stevie Wonder
1976 songs
Tamla Records singles
1995 singles
Song recordings produced by Stevie Wonder